Cricklade was a parliamentary constituency named after the town of Cricklade in Wiltshire.

From 1295 until the general election of 1885, Cricklade was a parliamentary borough, returning two members of parliament (MPs) to the House of Commons of the Parliament of the United Kingdom, previously to the House of Commons of England.

Initially this consisted of only the town of Cricklade, but from 1782 the vote was extended to the surrounding countryside as a punishment for the borough's corruption. The extended area came to include the village of Swindon, which later grew into a large town with the coming of the railways in the 19th century.

From the 1885 general election the borough was abolished, but the name was transferred to a county division of Wiltshire covering much the same area, and electing a single MP. This constituency was abolished for the 1918 general election: Cricklade joined the Chippenham constituency and a new Swindon constituency was created.

Boundaries
1832–1885: The hundreds of Highworth, Cricklade, Staple, Kingsbridge and Malmesbury, except the parliamentary borough of Malmesbury.

1885–1918: The Sessional Divisions of Cricklade and Swindon.

Members of Parliament

1295-1640

 Constituency created 1295

1640-1885

1885-1918

Elections

Elections in the 1830s

Gordon was appointed a Commissioner for the Affairs of India, causing a by-election.

Elections in the 1840s

Elections in the 1850s

Elections in the 1860s

Elections in the 1870s

Elections in the 1880s 

Costelloe contested previous general election as Conservative

Elections in the 1890s

Elections in the 1900s

Elections in the 1910s 

General Election 1914–15:

Another General Election was required to take place before the end of 1915. The political parties had been making preparations for an election to take place and by the July 1914, the following candidates had been selected; 
Liberal: Richard Cornthwaite Lambert
Unionist:

Notes

References 
Robert Beatson, A Chronological Register of Both Houses of Parliament (London: Longman, Hurst, Res & Orme, 1807) 
D Brunton & D H Pennington, Members of the Long Parliament (London: George Allen & Unwin, 1954)
Cobbett's Parliamentary history of England, from the Norman Conquest in 1066 to the year 1803 (London: Thomas Hansard, 1808) 
 F W S Craig, "British Parliamentary Election Results 1832-1885" (2nd edition, Aldershot: Parliamentary Research Services, 1989)
 J E Neale, The Elizabethan House of Commons (London: Jonathan Cape, 1949)
 Edward Porritt and Annie G Porritt, The Unreformed House of Commons (Cambridge University Press, 1903)
 Frederic A Youngs, jr, Guide to the Local Administrative Units of England, Vol I (London: Royal Historical Society, 1979)

Parliamentary constituencies in Wiltshire (historic)
Constituencies of the Parliament of the United Kingdom established in 1295
Constituencies of the Parliament of the United Kingdom disestablished in 1918
Politics of the Borough of Swindon
Cricklade